WLXR (1490 AM) is a radio station broadcasting an oldies format. Licensed to La Crosse, Wisconsin, United States, the station serves the La Crosse area. The station is currently owned by Dave Magnum, through licensee Magnum Communications, Inc. All the stations of the La Crosse Radio Group are housed at 1407 2nd Avenue North in Onalaska.

History
Originally, 1490 was known as WLCX. On June 20, 1947, the station began broadcasting on 1490 kHz with 250 watts of power. On July 1, 1947, WLCK became an ABC affiliate. The station was owned by Bermac Radio, Inc.

The station changed its call sign to WLDL on November 19, 1956, back to WLCX on April 21, 1957, and then to WLXR on July 7, 1983. On December 16, 1988, the station changed its call sign to WLFN, to reflect "Fun 1490" and the Oldies format. WLFN previously had an adult standards format and featured programming from CNN Radio and Dial Global's America's Best Music format. As an adult standards station, the station's programming switched to a holiday music format from Thanksgiving Day through Christmas. On July 1, 2012, WLFN switched formats from adult standards to talk, with the branding "Today's Talk 1490".

On July 31, 2020, Magnum Communications closed on the purchase of WLFN from Mississippi Valley Broadcasters, LLC, along with sister stations KQEG and WQCC, for $1.4 million. On August 1, 2020, WLFN changed their format back to Oldies, branded as "Eagle 1490". The station changed its call sign back to WLXR on August 7.

Previous logo

References

External links

LXR (AM)
Radio stations established in 1947
1947 establishments in Wisconsin
Oldies radio stations in the United States